Creolandreva is a genus of insect, belonging to the family Gryllidae.  The species of this genus occur in La Réunion and in Mauritius.

Species
Creolandrevan aptera Hugel, 2009 - (Réunion)
Creolandreva brachyptera  Hugel, 2009 - (Mauritius)
Creolandreva chaloupensis  Hugel, 2009 - (Réunion)
Creolandreva cocottensis  Hugel, 2009 - (Mauritius)
Creolandreva crepitans Hugel, 2009 - (Mauritius)
Creolandreva crypta  Hugel, 2009 - (Réunion)
Creolandreva pollexensis  Hugel, 2009 - (Mauritius)

References

Insects of Réunion
Crickets
Ensifera genera
Insects of Mauritius